Gavin Ward (born November 11, 1984) is a Canadian engineer working for Arrow McLaren in the IndyCar Series.

Career
Ward grew up in Toronto.  Whilst studying at Malvern Collegiate, he began volunteering with a local Formula Ford racing team. After finishing high school, Ward moved to England to study automotive engineering at Oxford Brookes University.

After initially getting his start with an internship in Red Bull Racing's R&D department, Ward rapidly rose through the ranks. Within 6 months RBR had moved him up to the race team where over the next 9 years he worked in various key roles including: trackside control systems engineer, tyre & vehicle dynamics engineer, and race engineer alongside David Coulthard, Mark Webber, Sebastian Vettel, and Daniel Ricciardo. In that time, he helped RBR to progress from a 7th place constructor to a 4x double championship winning and 50+ Grand Prix winning powerhouse.

After RBR finished first and second at the 2013 Abu Dhabi Grand Prix, Ward went up on the podium to collect the trophy for winning constructor on behalf of Red Bull Racing.  At the end of 2014, Ward moved into aero design at RBR.

Ward moved to the IndyCar Series in 2018 as a race engineer for Team Penske. He joined Arrow McLaren SP on January 4, 2022.

References

External links
 You don't have to drive the car to be a Formula One star Globe and Mail Article
 Engineers of the future The Paddock Magazine Article
 A Canadian At The Controls RedBull.com Article
 Toronto lad lives dream at Red Bull F1 Toronto Star Article
 The Red Bulletin Red Bulletin F1 

1984 births
Living people
Formula One engineers
Canadian engineers
Canadian motorsport people
Red Bull Racing
Alumni of Oxford Brookes University